Randalls Island (sometimes called Randall's Island) and Wards Island are conjoined islands, collectively called Randalls and Wards Islands, in New York County, New York City, separated from Manhattan Island by the Harlem River, from Queens by the East River and Hell Gate, and from the Bronx by the Bronx Kill. The two islands were formerly separated, with Randalls Island to the north of Wards Island. The channel between them, Little Hell Gate, was infilled by the early 1960s. A third, smaller island, Sunken Meadow Island, was located east of Randalls Island and was connected to it in 1955.

The park offers 91 athletic fields, a driving range, greenways, playgrounds and picnic grounds. The island also has a history of being used for asylums, hospitals, and cemeteries, and is currently home to several public facilities, including a psychiatric hospital known as the Manhattan Psychiatric Center, Kirby Forensic Psychiatric Center a Drug and Alcohol Treatment facility named Odyssey House, a daycare, 2 state police stations, FDNY fire academy, a DEP wastewater treatment plant, Icahn Stadium, HELP Clarke Thomas Mens Homeless Shelter, Keener Employment Homeless Mens Shelter, Schwartz Homeless Mens Shelter, HELP USA Supportive Employment Center, and an Urban Farm. Outside of these institutions and buildings, there is no residential housing for the general public on the island.

The island is crossed by the Triborough and Hell Gate bridges. The island can be reached by the Triborough Bridge; the Wards Island Bridge, which serves pedestrians and bicyclists and links the island to East Harlem in Manhattan; or by the Randalls Island Connector, a pedestrian and cycling bridge crossing the Bronx Kill and connecting to the Port Morris neighborhood of the Bronx. Randalls Island is the home of three music festivals: Governors Ball Music Festival, Panorama Music Festival, and Electric Zoo Festival.

History

Colonial era

Native Americans called Wards Island Tenkenas which translated to "Wild Lands" or "uninhabited place", whereas Randalls Island was called Minnehanonck. The islands were acquired by Wouter Van Twiller, Director General of the Dutch colony of New Netherland, in July 1637. The island's first European names were Great Barent Island (Wards) and Little Barent Island (Randalls) after a Danish cowherd named Barent Jansen Blom. Both islands' names changed several times. At times Randalls was known as "Buchanan's Island" and "Great Barn Island", both of which were likely corruptions of Great Barent Island.

Captain John Montresor, an engineer with the British army, purchased Randalls Island in 1772. He renamed it Montresor's Island and lived on it with his wife until the Revolutionary War forced him to deploy. During the Revolutionary War, both islands hosted military posts for the British. In 1776, the British used Randalls Island to launch amphibious attacks on Manhattan. Montresor's house there was burned in 1777. He resigned his commission and returned to England in 1778, but retained ownership of the island until the British evacuated the city in 1783 and it was confiscated.

Both islands gained their current names from new owners after the war. In November 1784, Jonathan Randell (or Randel) bought Randalls Island, while Jaspar Ward and Bartholomew Ward, sons of judge Stephen Ward, bought Wards.

Nineteenth century

Although a small population had lived on Wards since as early as the 17th century, the Ward brothers developed the island more heavily by building a cotton mill and in 1807 building the first bridge to cross the East River. The wooden drawbridge connected the island with Manhattan at 114th Street, and was paid for by Bartholomew Ward and Philip Milledolar. The bridge lasted until 1821, when it was destroyed in a storm. After the destruction of the bridge, Wards Island was largely abandoned until 1840. Jonathan Randel's heirs sold Randalls to the city in 1835 for $60,000.

In the mid-19th century, both Randalls and Wards Islands, like nearby Blackwell's Island, became home to a variety of social facilities. Randalls housed an orphanage, poor house, burial ground for the poor, "idiot" asylum, homeopathic hospital and rest home for Civil War veterans, and was also site of the New York House of Refuge, a reform school completed in 1854 for juvenile delinquents or juveniles adjudicated as vagrants. Between 1840 and 1930, Wards Island was used for:
 Burial of hundreds of thousands of bodies relocated from the Madison Square and Bryant Park graveyards
 The State Emigrant Refuge, a hospital for sick and destitute immigrants, opened in 1847, the biggest hospital complex in the world during the 1850s
 The New York City Asylum for the Insane, opened around 1863
 Manhattan Psychiatric Center (incorporating the Asylum for the Insane), operated by New York State when it took over the immigration and asylum buildings in 1899. With 4,400 patients, it was the largest psychiatric institution in the world. The 1920 census notes that the hospital had a total of 6,045 patients. It later became the Manhattan Psychiatric Center.

Infill operations 
When the Triborough Bridge opened in 1936, it spurred the conversion of both islands to parkland. At the time, Little Hell Gate separated Randalls and Wards Islands. Around the late 1930s, Little Hell Gate began to be narrowed using infill to make room for an expansion of the parks. By the early 1960s, the islands were connected.

There was also formerly another small island, Sunken Meadow Island, to the east of Randalls Island. It was infilled starting in 1955 when the city allowed construction companies to dump debris in between the islands for free. The former island is now part of Sunken Meadow. The Sunken Meadow section of the Randalls Island Park, which was essentially completed by 1965, comprises  and contains ball fields. Sunken Meadow also contains the infilled portion of Little Hell Gate.

Scylla Point

In 1984, the point at the southeastern tip of the island was officially designated "Negro Point", based on the unofficial usage of riverboat workers. The United States Geological Survey and the National Oceanic and Atmospheric Administration used that name. It still appears on charts of the area today. In 2001 the Parks Commissioner Henry Stern, upon learning of the name, thought it was offensive. He changed the name to "Scylla Point" and paired it with Charybdis Playground in Astoria Park; the two features are on opposite sides of Hell Gate, just as the mythological monsters of Scylla and Charybdis were on opposite sides of the Strait of Messina. Despite the name change Negro Point is still used by tug captains and mates as they sail past the area.

Parks

Proposals to add parks to the islands were made as early as 1916, but park development was truly kicked off by the 1930 Metropolitan Conference of Parks, which recommended transforming them into recreational parks. Randalls Island Park is operated by the Randall's Island Park Alliance (RIPA), a public-private partnership founded in 1992 as the Island Sports Foundation.

Randalls Island Park Alliance works with the City and local communities to provide sports venues, cultural events and environmental exploration. RIPA runs free youth programs at the Park, bringing thousands of children to the Park annually for a range of sports and environmental-education activities. Youth programs include public school field trips to the park's urban farm and saltmarsh, environmental and garden tours and workshops, and various outdoor arts and crafts programs. In addition, RIPA hosts Randalls Island Kids camp, a free six-week-long summer camp for children from community organizations in East Harlem and the South Bronx. Programming for the general public includes movies nights in the park, historical and environmental tours, outdoor yoga, and large festivals, including the Cherry Blossom and music festivals.

Randalls Island Park contains over 8 miles of pedestrian and bike pathways, the majority of which run along the scenic waterfront perimeter of the island. With connections to all three boroughs, the island acts as a non-vehicular route for traveling between Manhattan, the Bronx, and Queens. Connection to the South Bronx Greenway is planned, with additional waterfront pathway sections, a naturalized "living shoreline," and further environmental restoration. Greenway segments are part of the East Coast Greenway, a 3,000 mile long trail system connecting Maine to Florida.

A renovated golf center opened in 2008. The new  $500,000 renovation has a two-tier indoor/outdoor, 82-stall driving range,  of landing area, a 36-hole mini-golf course, grass tees, a short game area with sand bunker, PGA instructors, and 9 batting cages. Then, a tennis center opened in Randalls Island Park in July 2009. It features 20 courts, 10 har-tru and 10 rubberized hard (5 indoor), along with a cafe, pro shop, fitness facilities and locker rooms. From May–October, 10 courts are reserved for NYC Parks Tennis Permit holders during the daylight hours. In the winter, all 15 outdoor courts are bubbled for use by club members.

The center is also the home to the John McEnroe Tennis Academy and was home to the New York Sportimes of World TeamTennis until the team relocated to San Diego in 2014. Finally, in May 2010, RIPA and the New York City Department of Parks and Recreation completed the construction of over 60 athletic fields to support a greater variety of sports, including football, lacrosse, field hockey, and rugby among the sports already played at the Park, soccer, baseball and softball. Randalls Island Park has the most athletic fields of any single New York City park.

Three natural environments, two saltmarsh and a freshwater wetland, have been established on the island. Just across from the Little Hell Gate saltmarsh,  of freshwater wetlands were also established. In addition, the park is home to hundreds of birds, making it a destination for bird and nature enthusiasts.

After the removal of almost  of debris and fill, the freshwater wetland site was planted with native herbaceous, shrub, and tree species, such as switchgrass, aster, dogwood, and oak. In addition, the restoration projects play a crucial role in a park-wide filtration system that collects storm water from the adjacent sports fields, pathways and paved areas and channels it through the Wetlands, where the new plants naturally filter pollutants before reaching the East River.

The New York City Department of Parks and Recreation approved a $1 million contract with Natural Currents Energy Services to generate renewable energy in the park. The project was expected to produce  of solar, wind, and tidal energy to power the island's facilities. The project was planned to include a solar-powered marine research and information kiosk that would have been open to visitors of the island, and was hoped to have been completed in September 2012.

Migrant shelter
In October 2022, following a large influx of migrants seeking asylum in the United States to New York City, the administration of mayor Eric Adams announced that the city government would open an  shelter on Randalls Island. The shelter consisted of 500 beds for male migrants, but fewer than half of the beds were filled within two weeks of the shelter's opening. The Adams administration closed the migrant shelter in November 2022 due to a decrease in the number of new migrants.

Little Hell Gate

Little Hell Gate was originally a natural waterway separating Randalls Island and Wards Island. The east end of Little Hell Gate opened into the Hell Gate passage of the East River, opposite Astoria, Queens. The west end of Little Hell Gate met the Harlem River across from East 116th Street, Manhattan. At the Hell Gate Bridge, Little Hell Gate was over 1000 feet (300 m) wide. Currents were swift.

After the Triborough Bridge opened in 1936, it spurred the conversion of both islands to parkland. Soon thereafter, the city began filling in most of the passage between the two islands, in order to expand and connect the two parks. The inlet was filled in by the 1960s. What is now called "Little Hell Gate Inlet" is the western end of what used to be Little Hell Gate, however, few traces of the eastern end of Little Hell Gate still remain: an indentation in the shoreline on the East River side indicates the former east entrance to that waterway. Today, parkland and part of the New York City Fire Department Academy (see below) occupy that area.

Infrastructure and facilities

Facilities

The first stadium built on the island was the Downing Stadium, a WPA project. Upon its opening on July 11, 1936, 15,000 attendees witnessed Jesse Owens compete in the Men's Olympic Trials. Downing Stadium also hosted the Women's Olympic Trials in 1964. It was the site of an international soccer friendly in which England defeated the USA, 10–0, on May 27, 1964. In 1960, the owners of Ebbets Field donated 500 stadium lights to Downing Stadium. The lights came from the old stadium, which was being torn down. Downing Stadium was demolished in 2002, and replaced by the Icahn Stadium, which opened in April 2005. It was designed by architect Ricardo Zurita, who was also involved with the master planning of the park development. On May 31, 2008, Jamaican sprinter Usain Bolt broke the world record for the men's 100-meter dash at the Fourth Annual Reebok Grand Prix with a "lightning" speed time of 9.72 seconds.

 Icahn Stadium: The Icahn Stadium features an Olympic Track, meeting International Amateur Athletic Federation (IAAF) standards, used for track and field training and competitions. Bordering the Harlem River and visible from East Harlem, the stadium accommodates a variety of meets for public and private youth groups, and is available for public "Open Run" nights. Adjacent to the track is a synthetic turf field used for soccer and rugby. 
 Sports Fields: Randalls Island Park has 60+ fields, making up approximately 40% of all athletic fields in Manhattan. Field permitting is administered through the New York City Department of Parks and Recreation, and priority in field space is given to public schools and organizations from the local community. In addition, fields are used by various private youth and adult sports groups for training and competitions.  
Hospitals: The island is home to the Manhattan Psychiatric Center and the Kirby Forensic Psychiatric Center, both operated by the state Office of Mental Health. The Kirby Center houses the criminally insane, and is patrolled by the New York State Office of Mental Health Police.
Shelters: The island is home to the Charles Gay Assessment Shelter (1 Keener Building), Schwartz Men's Shelter and the Clarke Thomas Next Step Employment Center, all run by the New York City Department of Homeless Services and are patrolled by the New York City Department of Homeless Services Police.
Police: The New York State Police have a station on the island, Troop NYC. It provides investigative services such as Bureau of Criminal Investigation, Narcotics Enforcement Unit, Organized Crime Task Force, and Special Investigations Unit, and also provides support to state police operations in New York City, such as state police troopers patrolling the state-run Jacob K. Javits Convention Center, the governors office, and parade details.
Fire academy: The FDNY operates a training academy on Randalls Island. The academy's facilities include classrooms, a  water supply tank, a subway tunnel with tracks and two subway cars, a training course for engine drivers, a helicopter pad, a replica ship, and multiple buildings designed to simulate the different types of building construction encountered within the city limits.
New York City Parks Enforcement Patrol academy The New York City Parks Enforcement Patrol operates a training academy on Randalls Island. Training encompasses physical fitness, ethics, customer service, criminal procedure and penal law, parks rules and regulations, summons writing, verbal Judo, traffic control, NYC Parks & Urban Park Ranger history, animal rescue (domestic/wildlife), Ranger duties, ice rescue training, CPR and first aid, unarmed self-defense training and baton (PR-24) certification.
The city plans to install 7 megawatts of solar power at the plant.
Drug and Alcohol Treatment: The George Rosenfeld Center for Recovery (GRCR) operated by Odssey House opened in Spring 2017 and is located on the Wards Island part of Randalls Island.  It is a 231-bed multi-generational behavioral health treatment center with a focus on intensive substance abuse services for women and older adults.
Childcare Center: The George Rosenfeld Center for Recovery (GRCR) operated by Odssey House operates a 5 classroom daycare for children 3 years old to 5 years old.  Classrooms operate 8:30 am to 3:30 pm Monday thru Friday and 5:00 pm to 6:30 pm  Monday thru Friday to allow for parent participation in therapeutic group activities.

Bridges
In 1917, the Hell Gate Bridge, a railroad bridge, was built across both islands, running from Astoria, Queens to the Bronx. The bridge was first thought of in the early 1900s, as a plan to link New York and the Pennsylvania Railroad with New England and the New Haven Railroad. The bridge is considered to be extremely sturdy; it would be the last New York City bridge to collapse if humans disappeared, taking at least a millennium to do so, according to the February 2005 issue of Discover magazine, while most other bridges would fall in about 300 years.

In 1936, the islands were connected to the rest of the city by the Triborough Bridge, the hub of which crossed the islands. The American Society of Civil Engineers designated the Triborough Bridge Project as a National Historic Civil Engineering Landmark in 1986. On November 19, 2008, the Triborough Bridge was officially renamed after Robert F. Kennedy at the request of the Kennedy family. To manage the bridge (and eventually all tolled New York City water crossings), the Triborough Bridge and Tunnel Authority erected an art deco head building, the former base of Robert Moses; the building still stands on the island.

In 1937, the islands were connected by a bridge over Little Hell Gate, obviating the need for a ferry to Wards Island. There were two bridges that appear to have been known as Little Hell Gate Bridge – an early 20th-century rail bridge on the approach to Hell Gate Bridge, and a later, lower steel arch road bridge across Little Hell Gate. Although the majority of Little Hell Gate has been filled in, this bridge still exists.

The Little Hell Gate bridge was rendered obsolete when the Little Hell Gate was filled, and a service road was built alongside the deteriorating bridge. Efforts were made in the mid-1990s to preserve the bridge in the face of plans by the New York City Department of Transportation to demolish it. They were unsuccessful, and the bridge was replaced with a simple service road.

In 1937, plans were developed by Robert Moses to construct a pedestrian bridge across the Harlem River from East Harlem, providing Manhattan residents with easy access to the new Wards Island's Park. However, actual construction of this Wards Island Bridge, also known as the 103rd Street Footbridge, did not begin until 1949. Designed by Othmar Hermann Ammann and built by the U.S. Army Corps of Engineers, the footbridge was originally known as the Harlem River Pedestrian Bridge. This bridge opened to pedestrians on May 18, 1951 and was completed at a cost of $2.1 million. It gives access to Wards Island Park from East Harlem, which has few public green spaces.

In November 2015, a ground-level footbridge over the Bronx Kill, called the Randalls Island Connector, opened, forming the second link from Randalls Island to the Bronx. Construction of this bridge was proposed in 2006, but did not begin until 2013.

See also
 List of New York City parks

Notes and references

Footnotes

References

Further reading

External links

 Randall's Island Park Alliance
 History of Randall's Island
 History of Wards Island
 Map from 1885 showing Little Hell Gate
 

 
Harlem River
History of Manhattan
Islands of Manhattan
Islands of the East River
Neighborhoods in Manhattan